Alan Chong Lau (born July 11, 1948) is an American poet, and artist.

Life
Lau was born in Oroville, California and grew up in Paradise, California. He graduated from the University of California, Santa Cruz with a B.A. in Art. 
He serves as Arts Editor for the International Examiner. 
His art is represented at ArtXchange Gallery.
He lives in Seattle, Washington.

Awards
 1981 American Book Award
 Creative Artist Fellowship for Japan from the Japan-US Friendship Commission
 National Endowment for the Arts and the Agency for Cultural Affairs of the Japanese Government
 Artists Grant from Seattle Arts Commission
 Publications Grant from King County Arts Commission
 Special Projects Grant from the California Arts Council

Works
 no hurry (Cash Machine, 2007)

Anthologies

References

External links
"Conversations: Alan Chong Lau, Seattle poet, visual artist, and greengrocer", WaterBridge
"Oral history interview with Johsel Namkung, 1989 Oct. 5 - 1991 Feb. 25", Archives of American Art, Smithsonian Institution

University of California, Santa Cruz alumni
People from Oroville, California
1948 births
Living people
American poets of Asian descent
Artists from California
American Book Award winners